Helen Christie (22 October 1914 – 17 March 1995) was an Indian-born British stage, film and television actress. She was married to Patrick Crean.

Selected filmography
Film
 Up for the Cup (1950)
 Wide Boy (1952)
 Castle in the Air (1952)
 The Beggar's Opera (1953)
 Rasputin the Mad Monk (1966)
 Decline and Fall... of a Birdwatcher (1968)
 The Smashing Bird I Used to Know (1969)
 Lust for a Vampire (1971)
 Escort Girls (1975)

Television
 Melissa (1964)
 Middlemarch (1968)
 Wives and Daughters (1971)
 The Pallisers (1974)

References

External links

1914 births
1995 deaths
British stage actresses
British film actresses
British television actresses
20th-century British actresses
British people in colonial India